Aleksandr Samokhvalov may refer to:
Aleksandr Aleksandrovich Samokhvalov (born 1984), Russian footballer
Alexander Nikolayevich Samokhvalov  (1894–1971), Russian/Soviet painter